Reremoana Hakiwai (3 February 1889 – 8 March 1981) was a New Zealand cook and community leader.

Of Māori descent, she identified with the Ngati Porou and Rongowhakaata iwi.

Hakiwai was born in Manutuke, East Coast, New Zealand, on 3 February 1889. She attended the Hukarere Native School for Girls.

References

1889 births
1981 deaths
New Zealand chefs
Ngāti Porou people
Rongowhakaata people
People from Manutuke
People educated at Hukarere Girls' College
Halbert-Kohere family